Ephraim was a Biblical patriarch.

Ephraim may also refer to:

Tribe of Ephraim
Ephraim (given name)
Ephraim (surname)
Ephraim the Syrian (c. 306–373)
Ephraim of Nea Makri (1384–1426), Greek saint
Mount Ephraim, biblical region
Ephraim, Utah, USA
Ephraim, Wisconsin, USA
Ephraim (Fire Emblem), a character in Fire Emblem: The Sacred Stones

See also
Ephraim in the wilderness
Wood of Ephraim
Mount Ephraim, New Jersey, a borough in Camden County, New Jersey
Mount Ephraim (Vermont), a mountain near North Springfield, Vermont
Old Ephraim, a grizzly bear
Ephrem (name)
Yefremov
The Book of Ephraim, a 1976 poem by James Merrill in his 1982 trilogy The Changing Light at Sandover